Thami Lungisa Tsolekile (born 9 October 1980) is a South African former cricketer who played three Test matches for the national side as a wicketkeeper in 2004–05. He was educated in Cape Town at Pinelands High School.

In first-class cricket, Tsolekile was a regular wicketkeeper and captain of the Cape Cobras. At the beginning of the 2009/10 season, Tsolekile moved up to Johannesburg to go play for the Highveld Lions, after losing his place in the Cape Cobras side to Ryan Canning. During the season, he scored his second first-lass century and improved his highest score to 151 not out in a drawn match against Warriors at East London. He was involved in a South African domestic record partnership of 365 for the sixth wicket with opener Stephen Cook, who went on to make a record 390.

He also played hockey for his country at international level, scoring on debut, and played football during his childhood.

On 11 July 2012, Tsolekile was selected to play in South Africa's Test squad against England.

On 8 August 2016, Tsolekile was handed a 12-year ban for his role in numerous match-fixing violations in 2015. Jean Symes (7 years), Ethy Mbhalati (10 years), Lonwabo Tsotsobe (8 years) and Pumelela Matshikwe (10 years) also received similar bans from Cricket South Africa for their involvement in the various match-fixing activities.

References

External links 
 

1980 births
Living people
South African cricketers
South Africa Test cricketers
Western Province cricketers
Cape Cobras cricketers
Cricketers from Cape Town
South African male field hockey players
Banned sportspeople
Cricketers banned for corruption
Wicket-keepers